Delta was the name of a provincial electoral district in the Canadian province of British Columbia based on the municipality of Delta at the mouth of the Fraser River between the city of Vancouver and the US border.  It made its first appearance on the hustings in the election of 1903 and its last in the election of 1986, after which it was succeeded by Delta North and Delta South, which are the current ridings in the area.

Notable MLAs 

 John Oliver
 Nehemiah George Massey, after whom the George Massey Tunnel is named

Electoral history 

|Liberal
|John Oliver
|align="right"|447 		 	
|align="right"|59.13%
|align="right"|
|align="right"|unknown
 
|Conservative
|William Henry Ladner
|align="right"|309 	 		
|align="right"|40.87%
|align="right"|
|align="right"|unknown
|- bgcolor="white"
!align="right" colspan=3|Total valid votes
!align="right"|756  	
!align="right"|100.00%
!align="right"|
|- bgcolor="white"
!align="right" colspan=3|Total rejected ballots
!align="right"|
!align="right"|
!align="right"|
|- bgcolor="white"
!align="right" colspan=3|Turnout
!align="right"|%
!align="right"|
!align="right"|
|}

|Liberal
|John Oliver
|align="right"|430 	 		
|align="right"|62.23%
|align="right"|
|align="right"|unknown
 
|Conservative
|Francis James Anderson MacKenzie
|align="right"|261 	 		
|align="right"|37.77%
|align="right"|
|align="right"|unknown
|- bgcolor="white"
!align="right" colspan=3|Total valid votes
!align="right"|691
!align="right"|100.00%
!align="right"|
|- bgcolor="white"
!align="right" colspan=3|Total rejected ballots
!align="right"|
!align="right"|
!align="right"|
|- bgcolor="white"
!align="right" colspan=3|Turnout
!align="right"|%
!align="right"|
!align="right"|
|}
  	 

 
|Conservative
|Francis James Anderson MacKenzie
|align="right"|765 	 	 		
|align="right"|58.13%
|align="right"|
|align="right"|unknown

|Liberal
|John Oliver
|align="right"|551 	  	 		
|align="right"|41.87%
|align="right"|
|align="right"|unknown
|- bgcolor="white"
!align="right" colspan=3|Total valid votes
!align="right"|1,316 
!align="right"|100.00%
!align="right"|
|- bgcolor="white"
!align="right" colspan=3|Total rejected ballots
!align="right"|
!align="right"|
!align="right"|
|- bgcolor="white"
!align="right" colspan=3|Turnout
!align="right"|%
!align="right"|
!align="right"|
|- bgcolor="white"
!align="right" colspan=7|1  Results of recount as reported in New Westminster Columbian 29 November 1909, p. 1
|}
  	  	  	  	 

 
|Conservative
|Francis James Anderson MacKenzie
|align="right"|748 	 	 		
|align="right"|70.83%
|align="right"|
|align="right"|unknown

|Liberal
|John Oliver
|align="right"|308 	 	  	 		
|align="right"|29.17%
|align="right"|
|align="right"|unknown
|- bgcolor="white"
!align="right" colspan=3|Total valid votes
!align="right"|1,056
!align="right"|100.00%
!align="right"|
|- bgcolor="white"
!align="right" colspan=3|Total rejected ballots
!align="right"|
!align="right"|
!align="right"|
|- bgcolor="white"
!align="right" colspan=3|Turnout
!align="right"|%
!align="right"|
!align="right"|
|}	
  	  	  	  	   	  	  	 

 
|Conservative
|Francis James Anderson MacKenzie
|align="right"|964 		 	 		
|align="right"|51.55%
|align="right"|
|align="right"|unknown

|Liberal
|Alexander McDonald Paterson
|align="right"|906 	 	 	  	 		
|align="right"|48.45%
|align="right"|
|align="right"|unknown
|- bgcolor="white"
!align="right" colspan=3|Total valid votes
!align="right"|1,870 	 	
!align="right"|100.00%
!align="right"|
|- bgcolor="white"
!align="right" colspan=3|Total rejected ballots
!align="right"|
!align="right"|
!align="right"|
|- bgcolor="white"
!align="right" colspan=3|Turnout
!align="right"|%
!align="right"|
!align="right"|
|}
 	  	  	 	  	  	 

|Liberal
|John Oliver
|align="right"|1,334 	 	 	  	 		
|align="right"|37.50%
|align="right"|
|align="right"|unknown

|Soldier-Farmer
|Richmond Archie Payne
|align="right"|1,107 	 	 	  	 		
|align="right"|31.12%
|align="right"|
|align="right"|unknown
 
|Conservative
|Francis James Anderson MacKenzie
|align="right"|964 		 	 		
|align="right"|21.55%
|align="right"|
|align="right"|unknown
|- bgcolor="white"
!align="right" colspan=3|Total valid votes
!align="right"|3,557	 	
!align="right"|100.00%
!align="right"|
|- bgcolor="white"
!align="right" colspan=3|Total rejected ballots
!align="right"|
!align="right"|
!align="right"|
|- bgcolor="white"
!align="right" colspan=3|Turnout
!align="right"|%
!align="right"|
!align="right"|
|}
 	  	  	  	 

 
|Liberal
|Alexander McDonald Paterson 
|align="right"|1,677 	 		 	 		
|align="right"|46.13%
  
|Conservative
|Archibald Woodbury McLelan 
|align="right"|1,253 	 		 	 		
|align="right"|34.47%
  
|Provincial
|Saul A. Bonnell 
|align="right"|633 	 		 	 		
|align="right"|17.42%
  
|Independent Liberal
|Hugh Williams 
|align="right"|72
|align="right"|1.98%
|- bgcolor="white"
!align="right" colspan=3|Total valid votes
!align="right"|3,635  	
!align="right"|100.00%
  	   	 
  	  	  	 

 
|Conservative
|John Walter Berry
|align="right"|2,562 	 	 		 	 		
|align="right"|55.73%
|align="right"|
|align="right"|unknown
 
|Liberal
|Alexander McDonald Paterson 
|align="right"|2,035 	 	 	
|align="right"|44.27%
|align="right"|
|align="right"|unknown
|- bgcolor="white"
!align="right" colspan=3|Total valid votes
!align="right"|4,597 
!align="right"|100.00%
!align="right"|
|- bgcolor="white"
!align="right" colspan=3|Total rejected ballots
!align="right"|51
!align="right"|
!align="right"|
|- bgcolor="white"
!align="right" colspan=3|Turnout
!align="right"|%
!align="right"|
!align="right"|
|}  	 
  	  	  	  	 

 
|Co-operative Commonwealth Fed.
|Robert Swailes
|align="right"|2,631 	 		 	
|align="right"|36.95%
|align="right"|
|align="right"|unknown
 
|Liberal
|Alexander McDonald Paterson 
|align="right"|2,093 	 	 	 	
|align="right"|29.40%
|align="right"|
|align="right"|unknown

|Independent
|Rudolph Martin Grauer
|align="right"|1,735 		
|align="right"|24.37%
|align="right"|
|align="right"|unknown

|- bgcolor="white"
!align="right" colspan=3|Total valid votes
!align="right"|7,120 	 
!align="right"|100.00%
!align="right"|
|- bgcolor="white"
!align="right" colspan=3|Total rejected ballots
!align="right"|64
!align="right"|
!align="right"|
|- bgcolor="white"
!align="right" colspan=3|Turnout
!align="right"|%
!align="right"|
!align="right"|
|- bgcolor="white"
!align="right" colspan=7|2  Includes Conservatives who chose to run as straight Independents.  They are shown in the Results by Electoral District, when so indicated by newspaper reports, as Ind.(Cons.).  Because of internal discord, the provincial executive of the Conservative Party decided not to contest the election officially; each local association was to act on its own.
|}

 
|Co-operative Commonwealth Fed.
|Leonard Alec Shepherd
|align="right"|3,192 		
|align="right"|32.93%
 
|Liberal
|Arthur Laing 
|align="right"|3,102 	 	 	 	 	
|align="right"|32.01%
 
|Conservative
|Rudolph Martin Grauer
|align="right"|2,815 		
|align="right"|29.04%

|- bgcolor="white"
!align="right" colspan=3|Total valid votes
!align="right"|9,692 	
!align="right"|100.00%
!align="right"|
|- bgcolor="white"
!align="right" colspan=3|Total rejected ballots
!align="right"|150

 
|Co-operative Commonwealth Fed.
|Leonard Alec Shepherd
|align="right"|5,153 	
|align="right"|42.29%
|align="right"|
|align="right"|unknown
 
|Liberal
|Arthur Laing 
|align="right"|3,554 	 	 	 	 	
|align="right"|29.17%
|align="right"|
|align="right"|unknown
 
|Conservative
|Alexander Campbell Hope
|align="right"|3,478 	
|align="right"|28.54%
|align="right"|
|align="right"|unknown
|- bgcolor="white"
!align="right" colspan=3|Total valid votes
!align="right"|12,185  
!align="right"|100.00%
!align="right"|
|- bgcolor="white"
!align="right" colspan=3|Total rejected ballots
!align="right"|225
!align="right"|
!align="right"|
|- bgcolor="white"
!align="right" colspan=3|Turnout
!align="right"|%
!align="right"|
!align="right"|
|}
  	  	   	 

 
|Co-operative Commonwealth Fed.
|Leonard Alec Shepherd
|align="right"|5,063 	 	
|align="right"|46.36%
|align="right"|
|align="right"|unknown
|- bgcolor="white"
!align="right" colspan=3|Total valid votes
!align="right"|10,922 
!align="right"|100.00%
!align="right"|
|- bgcolor="white"
!align="right" colspan=3|Total rejected ballots
!align="right"|138
!align="right"|
!align="right"|
|- bgcolor="white"
!align="right" colspan=3|Turnout
!align="right"|%
!align="right"|
!align="right"|
|}

 
|Co-operative Commonwealth Fed.
|Leonard Alec Shepherd
|align="right"|11,110 	 	 	
|align="right"|45.15%
|align="right"|
|align="right"|unknown
 
|Social Credit
|Lyle Wicks
|align="right"|1,293 	 		
|align="right"|5.25%
|align="right"|
|align="right"|unknown
|- bgcolor="white"
!align="right" colspan=3|Total valid votes
!align="right"|24,606  
!align="right"|100.00%
!align="right"|
|- bgcolor="white"
!align="right" colspan=3|Total rejected ballots
!align="right"|903
!align="right"|
!align="right"|
|- bgcolor="white"
!align="right" colspan=3|Turnout
!align="right"|%
!align="right"|
!align="right"|
|} 	

 
|B.C. Social Credit League
|Thomas Irwin
|align="right"|11,759        
|align="right"|37.22%
|align="right"|14,805
|align="right"|52.69%
|align="right"|
 
|Co-operative Commonwealth Fed.
|Leonard Alec Shepherd
|align="right"|10,853           			 	 		 	
|align="right"|34.35%
|align="right"|13,295
|align="right"|47.31%
|align="right"|
 
|Progressive Conservative
|Alexander Campbell Hope
|align="right"|4,688          
|align="right"|14.84%
|align="right"| - 
|align="right"| -.- %
|align="right"|
 
|Liberal
|Donald Alexander Sutherland Lanskail
|align="right"|4,293 
|align="right"|13.59%
|align="right"| -
|align="right"| -.- %
|align="right"|
|- bgcolor="white"
!align="right" colspan=3|Total valid votes
!align="right"|31,593         
!align="right"|100.00%
!align="right"|28,100
|align="right"|
|align="right"|
|- bgcolor="white"
!align="right" colspan=3|Total rejected ballots
!align="right"|2,172
!align="right"|
!align="right"|
!align="right"|
!align="right"|
|- bgcolor="white"
!align="right" colspan=3|Turnout
!align="right"|%
!align="right"|
!align="right"|
!align="right"|
!align="right"|
|- bgcolor="white"
!align="right" colspan=7|3  Preferential ballot.  First and final of three counts only shown.
|}
	  	  	

 
|Co-operative Commonwealth Fed.
|Leonard Alec Shepherd
|align="right"|11,095 	 	
|align="right"|35.80%
|align="right"|13,108
|align="right"|45.95%
|align="right"|
 
|Liberal
|Leslie Gilmore
|align="right"|5,500 		 	
|align="right"|17.75%
|align="right"|
|align="right"|%
|align="right"|
 
|Progressive Conservative
|Robert William Pybus
|align="right"|591 	 		 	 	
|align="right"|1.91%
|align="right"| - 
|align="right"| -.- %
|align="right"|

|- bgcolor="white"
!align="right" colspan=3|Total valid votes
!align="right"|30,990 	  	 	  	 	   
!align="right"|100.00%
!align="right"|28,525
|align="right"|
|align="right"|
|- bgcolor="white"
!align="right" colspan=3|Total rejected ballots
!align="right"|1,786
!align="right"|
!align="right"|
!align="right"|
!align="right"|
|- bgcolor="white"
!align="right" colspan=3|Turnout
!align="right"|%
!align="right"|
!align="right"|
!align="right"|
!align="right"|
|- bgcolor="white"
!align="right" colspan=7|4  Preferential ballot.  First and second of six counts only shown.
|- bgcolor="white"
!align="right" colspan=7|5  Not the leftist People's Party of earlier times, but a populist one also identified as the Common Herd.
|}
 	 

 
|Co-operative Commonwealth Fed.
|Walter H. Johnson
|align="right"|11,202 	 	 	
|align="right"|16.22%
|align="right"|
|align="right"|unknown
 
|Co-operative Commonwealth Fed.
|James Henry Rhodes
|align="right"|10,798 	 	
|align="right"|15.63%
|align="right"|
|align="right"|unknown
 
|Liberal
|Victor A. McPherson
|align="right"|5,149 	 	
|align="right"|7.46%
|align="right"|
|align="right"|unknown
 
|Liberal
|William Pearce Wilson
|align="right"|4,680 		  	
|align="right"|6.78%
|align="right"|
|align="right"|unknown

|- bgcolor="white"
!align="right" colspan=3|Total valid votes
!align="right"|69,066  
!align="right"|100.00%
!align="right"|
|- bgcolor="white"
!align="right" colspan=3|Total rejected ballots
!align="right"|352
!align="right"|
!align="right"|
|- bgcolor="white"
!align="right" colspan=3|Turnout
!align="right"|%
!align="right"|
!align="right"|
|- bgcolor="white"
!align="right" colspan=7|6  Seat increased to two members from one.
|}
 	  	  	  	 

 
|Co-operative Commonwealth Fed.
|Camille Mather
|align="right"|21,839 		 	 	
|align="right"|20.54%
|align="right"|
|align="right"|unknown
 
|Co-operative Commonwealth Fed.
|James Henry Rhodes
|align="right"|21,559 	 	
|align="right"|20.28%
|align="right"|
|align="right"|unknown

 
|Liberal
|Arthur R. Helps
|align="right"|8,529 	
|align="right"|8.02%
|align="right"|
|align="right"|unknown
 
|Liberal
|C. Douglas Morris
|align="right"|8,517 		 	
|align="right"|8.01%
|align="right"|
|align="right"|unknown
 
|Progressive Conservative
|George Francis Crowe
|align="right"|2,280 	 	 			
|align="right"|2.14%
|align="right"|
|align="right"|unknown
 
|Progressive Conservative
|Dalton O. Jones
|align="right"|2,159 	 	 			
|align="right"|2.03%
|align="right"|
|align="right"|unknown

|Independent
|Gordon Lionel Gibson
|align="right"|2,010 		 	 			
|align="right"|1.89%
|align="right"|
|align="right"|unknown

|Independent
|Norman Baker
|align="right"|220 	 	 			
|align="right"|0.21%
|align="right"|
|align="right"|unknown

|- bgcolor="white"
!align="right" colspan=3|Total valid votes
!align="right"|106,328  
!align="right"|100.00%
!align="right"|
|- bgcolor="white"
!align="right" colspan=3|Total rejected ballots
!align="right"|834
!align="right"|
!align="right"|
|- bgcolor="white"
!align="right" colspan=3|Turnout
!align="right"|%
!align="right"|
!align="right"|
|}

 
|Co-operative Commonwealth Fed.
|Camille Mather
|align="right"|18,690 	 		 	 	
|align="right"|18.63%
|align="right"|
|align="right"|unknown
 
|Co-operative Commonwealth Fed.
|James Henry Rhodes
|align="right"|17,661 	
|align="right"|17.60%
|align="right"|
|align="right"|unknown
 
|Liberal
|J.T. "Jock" Smith
|align="right"|5,553 	
|align="right"|5.53%
|align="right"|
|align="right"|unknown
 
|Liberal
|Harry Lewis Huff
|align="right"|5,342 		
|align="right"|5.32%
|align="right"|
|align="right"|unknown
 
|Progressive Conservative
|Theodore Kuhn
|align="right"|4,461 	 	 			
|align="right"|4.45%
|align="right"|
|align="right"|unknown
 
|Progressive Conservative
|Thomas Horan
|align="right"|4,049 	 	 	 			
|align="right"|4.04%
|align="right"|
|align="right"|unknown

|- bgcolor="white"
!align="right" colspan=3|Total valid votes
!align="right"|100,327 	
!align="right"|100.00%
!align="right"|
|- bgcolor="white"
!align="right" colspan=3|Total rejected ballots
!align="right"|473
!align="right"|
!align="right"|
|- bgcolor="white"
!align="right" colspan=3|Turnout
!align="right"|%
!align="right"|
!align="right"|
|}

 
|New Democrat
|Thomas Jack Howard
|align="right"|6,078 		 	 	
|align="right"|36.35%
|align="right"|
|align="right"|unknown
 
|Liberal
|George Garrett
|align="right"|1,954 			
|align="right"|11.69%
|align="right"|
|align="right"|unknown
 
|Progressive Conservative
|Philip Govan
|align="right"|921 		 	 			
|align="right"|5.51%
|align="right"|
|align="right"|unknown
|- bgcolor="white"
!align="right" colspan=3|Total valid votes
!align="right"|16,721 
!align="right"|100.00%
!align="right"|
|- bgcolor="white"
!align="right" colspan=3|Total rejected ballots
!align="right"|153
!align="right"|
!align="right"|
|- bgcolor="white"
!align="right" colspan=3|Turnout
!align="right"|%
!align="right"|
!align="right"|
|- bgcolor="white"
!align="right" colspan=7|2  Seat decreased to one member from two.
|}

 
|New Democrat
|Carl Liden
|align="right"|9,855 	 		 	 	
|align="right"|35.78%
|align="right"|
|align="right"|unknown
 
|Liberal
|Doral Hemm
|align="right"|3,545 				
|align="right"|12.87%
|align="right"|
|align="right"|unknown
|- bgcolor="white"
!align="right" colspan=3|Total valid votes
!align="right"|27,545 
!align="right"|100.00%
!align="right"|
|- bgcolor="white"
!align="right" colspan=3|Total rejected ballots
!align="right"|295
!align="right"|
!align="right"|
|- bgcolor="white"
!align="right" colspan=3|Turnout
!align="right"|%
!align="right"|
!align="right"|
|}

 
|New Democrat
|Carl Liden
|align="right"|15,040 	 	 		 	 	
|align="right"|39.90%
|align="right"|
|align="right"|unknown

 
|Progressive Conservative
|Marcia Ann Boyd
|align="right"|6,660 	 		 	 			
|align="right"|17.67%
|align="right"|
|align="right"|unknown
 
|Liberal
|Lorne L. Donnelly
|align="right"|3,730 	 				
|align="right"|9.90%
|align="right"|
|align="right"|unknown
|- bgcolor="white"
!align="right" colspan=3|Total valid votes
!align="right"|37,690
!align="right"|100.00%
!align="right"|
|- bgcolor="white"
!align="right" colspan=3|Total rejected ballots
!align="right"|378
!align="right"|
!align="right"|
|- bgcolor="white"
!align="right" colspan=3|Turnout
!align="right"|%
!align="right"|
!align="right"|
|}

 
|New Democrat
|Carl Liden
|align="right"|17,469 		 	 		 	 	
|align="right"|35.98%
|align="right"|
|align="right"|unknown
 
|Progressive Conservative
|John O'Brien Bell
|align="right"|2,857 		 		 	 			
|align="right"|5.88%
|align="right"|
|align="right"|unknown
 
|Liberal
|Arthur Edward Bates
|align="right"|2,236 	 				
|align="right"|4.60%
|align="right"|
|align="right"|unknown

|- bgcolor="white"
!align="right" colspan=3|Total valid votes
!align="right"|48,559 
!align="right"|100.00%
!align="right"|
|- bgcolor="white"
!align="right" colspan=3|Total rejected ballots
!align="right"|592
!align="right"|
!align="right"|
|- bgcolor="white"
!align="right" colspan=3|Turnout
!align="right"|%
!align="right"|
!align="right"|
|}

 
|New Democrat
|Carl Liden
|align="right"|11,429 		 		 	 	
|align="right"|38.35%
|align="right"|
|align="right"|unknown
 
|Progressive Conservative
|Elsie Gwendolyn Burnett
|align="right"|1,877 	 		 		 	 			
|align="right"|6.30%
|align="right"|
|align="right"|unknown

|- bgcolor="white"
!align="right" colspan=3|Total valid votes
!align="right"|29,800 
!align="right"|100.00%
!align="right"|
|- bgcolor="white"
!align="right" colspan=3|Total rejected ballots
!align="right"|228
!align="right"|
!align="right"|
|- bgcolor="white"
!align="right" colspan=3|Turnout
!align="right"|%
!align="right"|
!align="right"|
|}

 
|New Democrat
|Karl H. Moser
|align="right"|13,300 		 		 	 	
|align="right"|36.12%
|align="right"|
|align="right"|unknown
 
|Progressive Conservative
|David Peter Hoyt
|align="right"|1,117 		
|align="right"|3.03%
|align="right"|
|align="right"|unknown
 
|Liberal
|Ken Buhay
|align="right"|464 	 	 				
|align="right"|1.26
|align="right"|
|align="right"|unknown

|- bgcolor="white"
!align="right" colspan=3|Total valid votes
!align="right"|36,827 	
!align="right"|100.00%
!align="right"|
|- bgcolor="white"
!align="right" colspan=3|Total rejected ballots
!align="right"|247
!align="right"|
!align="right"|
|- bgcolor="white"
!align="right" colspan=3|Turnout
!align="right"|%
!align="right"|
!align="right"|
|}

 
|New Democrat
|Karl H. Moser
|align="right"|13,581 		 		 	 	
|align="right"|18.94%
|align="right"|
|align="right"|unknown
 
|New Democrat
|Sylvia K. Bishop
|align="right"|11,984 	 		 		 	 	
|align="right"|16.72%
|align="right"|
|align="right"|unknown
 
|Liberal
|Samuel D. Stevens
|align="right"|2,855 		 				
|align="right"|3.98%
|align="right"|
|align="right"|unknown
 
|Progressive Conservative
|Kenneth Douglas Smith
|align="right"|1,804 		
|align="right"|2.52%
|align="right"|
|align="right"|unknown
|- bgcolor="white"
!align="right" colspan=3|Total valid votes
!align="right"|71,697 	
!align="right"|100.00%
!align="right"|
|- bgcolor="white"
!align="right" colspan=3|Total rejected ballots
!align="right"|722
!align="right"|
!align="right"|
|- bgcolor="white"
!align="right" colspan=3|Turnout
!align="right"|%
!align="right"|
!align="right"|
|- bgcolor="white"
!align="right" colspan=7|8  Seat increased to two members from one.
|}

The Delta riding was partitioned after the 1986 election into Delta North and Delta South.

Sources 

Elections BC Historical Returns

Former provincial electoral districts of British Columbia
Politics of Delta, British Columbia